The Ewell Farm is a historic farmhouse in Spring Hill, Tennessee, United States.

History
The two-storey farmhouse was built in 1867. It was the residence of General Richard S. Ewell, who served in the Confederate States Army during the American Civil War, and his wife, George W. Campbell's daughter.

The farm was used for raising cattle and sheep.

Architectural significance
The farmhouse has been listed on the National Register of Historic Places since May 24, 1976.

References

Farms on the National Register of Historic Places in Tennessee
Italianate architecture in Tennessee
Houses completed in 1867
Houses in Maury County, Tennessee
National Register of Historic Places in Maury County, Tennessee